Saurauia is a large genus of flowering plants in the family Actinidiaceae. , there are around 330 accepted species.

References

L
Saurauia